morze – a sea in Polish
 Morze – the Polish name for the 1933 film The Sea
 Morze – lake in Poland, in Warmian-Masurian Voivodeship

Morze may also refer to the following places in Poland:
 Morze, Hajnówka County – village in Podlaskie Voivodeship (north-east Poland)
 Morze, Siemiatycze County – village in Podlaskie Voivodeship (north-east Poland)

Other:
 Franciszek Morze (1802–1852) – Polish lawyer